Sobornyi District is an urban district of the city of Dnipro, in southern Ukraine. It is located in the city's center on the right-bank of the Dnieper River.

History
According to archeological finds, in the Paleolithic period (7—3 thousand Anno Domini) human settlements appear on Monastyrskyi Island; which is located in Sobornyi District. Traces of Cimmerian settlements during the Bronze Age have been found near today's Sobornyi District's .

The current district Sobornyi District was created on 16 March 1936 out of the Kirovskyi and Fabrychno-Chechelivskyi districts. In 1973, a portion of its territory was annexed to the newly created Babushkinskyi District. Before 26 November 2015 the district was named Zhovtnevyi; on that day the district was renamed to comply with decommunization laws.

On 14 January 2023 a Russian missile destroyed a residential building on Sobornyi District's , 118; killing over 40 people.

Neighborhoods
 Nahirny
 Laherny
 Vuzivsky
 Mandrykivka
 Lotskamianka
 Peremoha
 Sokil

Gallery

References

External links

  

Urban districts of Dnipro
States and territories established in 1936
1936 establishments in Ukraine